Ch'ŏrwŏn County is a kun, or county, in Kangwŏn province, North Korea.  Portions of it were once a single county together with the county of the same name in South Korea; other portions were added from neighbouring counties in the 1952 reorganization of local governments.  After the initial division of Korea, the entire county lay to the Northern side of the dividing line, but in the course of the Korean War part of the county was taken by the South.

Geography
The county's terrain is mountainous in the north, but gradually more level towards the south.  The Masingryong Mountains pass through the county; the highest point of which is the  Taehwang Peak (대왕덕산).  The chief watercourse is the Rimjin River.  Approximately 54% of the county's area is occupied by forests.

Administrative divisions
Ch'ŏrwŏn county is divided into 1 ŭp (town) and 36 ri (villages):

Economy
The chief local industry is agriculture.  The county is a major producer of rice for North Korea.  Additional crops include maize, soybeans, wheat, and barley.  Other local industries include mining, sericulture, and orcharding.  The county is host to deposits of coal, iron ore, magnetite, and manganese.  There is little manufacturing.

Transportation
The county is not connected to the national rail grid, but is served by roads.

See also
Geography of North Korea
Administrative divisions of North Korea
Kangwon (North Korea)
Anhyop County

Notes

External links

Counties of Kangwon Province (North Korea)